Resul Dindar (born 24 January 1982) is a Turkish singer. In 2008, he founded the music group Karmate (which in Laz language means mill) with friends, and made the two albums Nani and Nayino. He went solo after 2012, and his first solo album called Divane came out in 2013.

Discography

Albums
as part of Karmate
Nani
Nayino

Solo
Divane (2013)
Dalgalan Karadeniz (2014)
Aşk-ı Meşk (2017)

Singles
 Sorma (2016)
 Hiç (2016)
 Güzelliğin On Para Etmez (2016)
 Öptüm (2017)
 Eyvallah (2018)
 Yangın Yeri (2018)

See also
 Turkish music

References

External links
 Official Website 

1982 births
Living people
Laz people
21st-century Turkish singers
21st-century Turkish male singers